There are many Little House on the Prairie characters, appearing in various forms of media in the Little House on the Prairie media franchise.

Television series characters

The Ingalls family

The in-laws

Townsfolk

One-shot characters

Season one
Episode 6
Miss Amy Hearn (played by Josephine Hutchinson)
Episode 7
Olga Nordstrom (played by Kim Richards)
Episode 9
Abel Makay (played by Dirk Blocker)
Episode 11
Tinker Jones (played by Chuck McCann)
Episode 14
Jonathan (played by Ernest Borgnine)
Episode 17
Kate Thorvald (played by Anne Archer)
Episode 19
Willie O'Hara (played by Red Buttons)
Episode 20
Graham Stewart (played by Johnny Lee)
John Stewart (played by Harris Yulin)
Episode 21
Trudy Coulter (played by Julie Cobb)
Joseph Coulter (played by Alan Fudge)
Episode 22
Jack Lame Horse (played by Robert Tessier)
Marshal Anders (played by Jack Ging)
Episode 23
Hiram Johnson (played by Hal Bokar)
Mimi (played by Jane Alice Brandon)
Episode 24
Jim Tyler (played by Forrest Tucker)
Helen Tyler (played by Ann Doran)

Season two
Episode 4
Jebediah Mumfort (played by Karl Lukas)
Margaret Mumfort (played by June Dayton)
Slick McBurney (played by Gregory Walcott)
Episode 5
Amos Pike (played by John Anderson)
Episode 7
Julia Sanderson (played by Patricia Neal)
Episode 10
Jonah (played by Shane Sinutko)
Episode 17
Hannibal Applewood (played by Richard Basehart)
Episode 18
Henry Hill (played by Louis Gossett Jr)
Episode 19
Elizabeth Thurman (played by Mariette Hartley)
Episode 20
Yuli Pyatakov (played by Theodore Bikel)
Viktor Pyatakov (played by Ike Eisenmann)
Fanya Pyatakov (played by Lisa Pera)
Episode 21
Granville Whipple (played by Richard Mulligan)

Season three
Episode 1
Caleb Hodgekiss (played by Johnny Cash)
Mattie Hodgekiss (played by June Carter Cash)
Episode 4
Wendell Loudy (played by John Ireland)
Episode 6
Young Charles Ingalls (played by Matthew Labyorteaux)
Lansford Ingalls (played by Arthur Hill)
Laura Colby Ingalls (played by Jan Sterling)
Eliza Ann Ingalls (played by Hersha Parady)
Peter Ingalls (played by Mark Lenard)
Episode 9
Bubba Galinder (played by Michael LeClair)
George Galinder (played by Roy Jenson)
Sam Galinder (played by Geoffrey Lewis)
Episode 10
Sam Shelby (played by Burl Ives)
Ben Shelby (played by Johnny Crawford)
Episode 14
Ginny Clark (played by Rachel Longaker)
Harold Mayfield (played by Warren Vanders)
Della Clark (played by Kay Peters)
Episode 15
Joseph Spotted Eagle Stokes (played by Caesar Ramirez)
Seth (played by Willie Aames)
Jeremy Stokes (played by George Murdock)
Episode 18
Solomon Henry (played by Todd Bridges)
Mrs. Henry (played by Maidie Norman)
Jackson Henry (played by David Downing (actor))
Kramer (played by Frederic Downs)
Dr. Tane (played by Don Pedro Colley)
Episode 19
Anna Gillberg (played by Katy Kurtzman)
Episode 20
Elmer Dobkins (played by Eric Olson)
Sam Dobkins (played by Charles Aidman)
Ellen Dobkins (played by Mitzi Hoag)
Episode 21
Zachariah (played by E.J. Andre)
Rev. Phillips (played by Larry Golden)
Ben Griffin (played by Larry Pennell)

Season four
Episode 2
Patrick - boy on train (played by Mike Lookinland)
Episode 3
Ellen Taylor (played by Mia Bendixsen)
Eloise Taylor (played by Corinne Michaels)
Cal Taylor (played by James Wainwright)
Episode 4
Chris Nelson (played by Gil Gerard)
Episode 6
Bailey Farrell (played by Bernard Behrens)
Timothy Farrell (played by Johnny Doran)
Episode 7
Stanley Novack (played by Michael Pataki)
Beth Novack (played by Collin Wilcox)
Jed Haney (played by Eddie Quillan)
Dr. Asa T Logan (played by Burr DeBenning)
Episode 8
Mr. Dankworth (played by Dennis Rucker)
Mr. Hobbs (played by John Bennett Perry)
Bob Ford (played by Tony Marks)
Lewis Ford (played by Frank Marth)
Episode 9
Judge Picker (played by Eddie Quillan)
Episode 14
Samantha Higgins (played by Seeley Ann Thumann)
Jimmy Hill (played by Chris Petersen)
Episode 15
Nats Rachel Peal (played by Anita Dangler)
Caleb Fisher (played by John McLiam)
Katie Fisher (played by Linda McMillan)
Ellen Fisher (played by Dee Croxton)
Episode 16
Jordan Harrison (played by Ronnie Scribner)
Young Caroline (played by Katy Kurtzman)
Younger Laura Colby Ingalls (played by Sarah Miller)
Mr. Watson (played by Sorrell Booke)
Harold Watson (played by Adam Gunn)
Peter Ingalls (played by David Considine)
Henry Quiner-Holbrook (played by Gregg Forrest)
Polly Ingalls (played by Robin Muir)
Eliza Ann Quiner-Holbrook (played by Kristi Jill Wood)
Lansford Ingalls (played by Nicolas Coster)
Charlotte Holbrook (played by Virginia Kiser)
Young Charles Ingalls (played by Matthew Labyorteaux)
Episode 17
Bobby Harris (played by Michael Mullins)
Anna Mears (played by Lenora May)
Shaniel Mears (played by Donald Moffat)
Rev. Pritchard (played by Woodrow Parfrey)
Episode 21
Dr. Burke (played by Ford Rainey)
Miseth Barton (played by Rob Kenneally)

Season five
Episode 4
John Bevins (played by Cliff Emmich)
Bess Bevins (played by Kate Woodville)
Amelia Bevins (played by Julie Ann Haddock)
Episode 8
Erich Schiller (played by Ike Eisenmann)
Otto Schiller (played by King Moody)
Anna Schiller (played by Lisa Pera)
Episode 15
Isaac Singerman (played by John Bleifer)
Aaron Singerman (played by Alvin Kupperman)
Episode 18
Miss Elliot (played by Ellen Regan)
Holly (played by Martha Nix)
Giles Kendall (played by Philip Abbott)
Episode 20
Adele Larrabee (played by Joan Tompkins—wife of Karl Swenson)
Episode 22
Leslie Harper (played by Jenny Sullivan)
Samantha Harper (played by Kyle Richards)
Bret Harper (played by Charles Cioffi)
Thomas Harper (played by Bobby Rolofson)
Episode 24
Dylan Whitaker (played by Steve Shaw)

Season six
Episode 3
Jeremy Quinn (played by Michael Pataki)
Episode 6
Russell Harmon (played by William Schallert)
Anna Craig Alden (played by Iris Korn)
Episode 9
Milo Stavroupolis (played by Leo Gordon)
Anna Stavroupolis (played by Nora Meerbaum)
Episode 10
Rev. Danforth (played by James Olson)
Episode 12
Harold (played by Royal Dano)
Episode 13
Tod Dortmunder (played by Timothy Wead)
Brewster Davenport (played by Malcolm Atterbury)
Virginia Davenport (played by Susan French)
Episode 20
Penelope Parker (played by Stacey Sipes)
Episode 21
Molly Reardon (played by Suzanne Rogers)
Episode 22
Miss Trimble (played by Lucille Benson)

Season seven
Episode 1
Harv Miller (played by James Cromwell)
Episode 4
Dan Ellerbee (played by James Jarnagin)
Pete Ellerbee (played by William Traylor)
Episode 6
Annie Crane (played by Madeleine Stowe)
Episode 7
Brenda Sue Longworth (played by Tisch Raye)
Episode 8
Leslie Barton (played by Suzy Gilstrap)
Episode 9
Kavendish (played by Eddie Quillan)
Episode 13
Benjamin Cohen (played by E.M. Margolese
Edna Cohen (played by 	Bea Silvern)
Episode 15
Hertzell Lundy (played by Mel Stewart)
Timothy (played by Keith Mitchell)
Episode 17 & 18 (two-part episode)
Sylvia Webb (played by Olivia Barash)
Hector Webb (played by Royal Dano)
Irv Hartwig (played by Richard Jaeckel)
Episode 19
Edgar Mills (played by Jeff Corey)
Edna Mills (played by Barbara Collentine—wife of Richard Bull)
Episode 21
Mr Case (played by Ivan Bonar)
Jed Cooper (played by EJ Andre)
Sarah Cooper (played by M.E. Loree)
Alvin Cooper (played by George McDaniel)
Episode 22
Isaiah Tomkins (played by Len Wayland)

Season eight
Episode 1
Miss Mason (played by Elizabeth Hoffman)
Episode 4
Dr. Caleb Ledoux (played by Don Marshall)
Mattie Ledoux (played by Marlene Warfield)
Episode 5
Mortimer Carstairs (played by Patrick Collins)
Ralph Waldo Emerson (played by George Petrie)
Episode 6
Amy Cassidy (played by Martha Nix)
Rodolfo Gambini (played by Jack Kruschen)
Ana Rosa Gambini (played by Gloria Manos)
Marco Gambini (played by Stephen Manley)
Stefano Gambini (played by Robert Torti)
Episode 7
Max (played by Todd Susman)
Georgie (played by Royce D. Applegate)
Episode 8
Callahan (played by M. Emmet Walsh)
Episode 9
Elmer Miles (played by J.Brennan Smith)
Episode 10
Major Guffey (played by Laurie Main)
Episode 12
Gideon Hale (played by Peter Billingsley)
Braden Hale (played by Dennis Howard)
Mrs. Hale (played by Jennifer Rhodes)
Episode 14
Jack Prescott (played by Claude Earl Jones)
Episode 16
Sam Terhune (played by J.A. Preston)
Naomi Terhune (played by Marguerite DeLain)
Episode 20
Sherman Andruss (played by Dennis Lipscomb)
Helen Andruss (played by Judith Weston)
Louisa Beckwith (played by Ruth Silveira)
Horace Beckwith (played by Calvin Bartlett)
Nora Cramer (played by Betty McGuire)
Episode 21
Danny (played by Georg Olden)
Episode 22
Old Man (played by Don Beddoe)

Season nine
Episode 3
Lem McCary (played by Lew Ayres)
Jess Moffet (played by Charles Lane)
Episode 4
Thomas Stark (played by Robert Loggia)
Constance Stark (played by Michele Marsh)
Elizabeth Stark (played by Tammy Lauren)
Randall Page (played by Ronnie Scribner)
Episode 5
Lou Bates (played by Billy Barty)
Mrs. Bates (played by Susan French)
Episode 10
Jane Canfield (played by Jill Schoelen)
Episode 12
Dr. Marvin Haynes (played by Ralph Bellamy)
Episode 13
Linda McAndrews (played by Sheila Larken)
Elliott Reed (played by John McLiam)
Episode 14
Cole Younger (played by Geoffrey Lewis)
Bart Younger (played by Robert Donner)
Lonnie Younger (played by Timothy Scott)
Episode 16
Matthew Rogers (played by Jonathan Hall Kovacs)
Episode 19
Ruthy Leland (played by Vera Miles)
Dewey Harrison (played by Eric Christmas)
Episode 20
Buffalo Bill (played by Eddie Quillan)
Episode 21
Mae Flannery (played by Barbara Townsend)
Episode 22
Philip Rogers (played by Robert Darnell)
Sherwood Montague (played by Robert Casper)

Post-series movies
Little House: The Last Farewell
Nathan Lassiter (played by James Karen)

Animals
 Dogs: Jack and Bandit
 Horses: Pat and Patty
 Pony: Bunny
 Goat: Fred
 Bull: Fagin
 Raccoon: Jasper
 Cat: Pepper
 Orangutan: Blanche
 Turkey: Tom
?

Ingalls' and Wilder's genealogy

The Ingalls family

 Ingalls line :
 Henry Ingalls and Joan/Johan Wytton
 Robert Ingalls (1563-1617) and Elizabeth ? (1567-1631)
 Edmund Ingalls (1598-1648) and Ann Tripp (1599-1648)
 Henry Ingalls (1627-1718) and Mary Osgood (1633-1686)
 Samuel Ingalls (1654-1733) and Sarah Hendrick (1661-1738)
 Samuel Ingalls Jr. (1683-1747) and Mary E. Watts (1687-?)
 Timothy Ingalls (1720-1757) and ?

 Delano line :
 Jonathan Delano (b.1647) and Mercy Warren (1658–1727) (gdau. of Richard Warren of the Mayflower)
 Jonathan Delano (b.1680) and Amy Hatch (b.1687)
 Jabez Delano (b.1708) and Prudence Hibbard (b.1711)

 Colby line :
 Matthew Colby (b.1530) and (from 1555) Mary (last name unknown) (b.1532)
 Thomas Colby (b.1567) and (from May 4, 1596) Anne Jackson (b.1571)
 Anthony Colby (b.1605) and (from 1632) Susanna Haddon (b.1608)
 John Colby (b.1633) and (from January 14, 1655) Frances Hoyt (b.1636)
 John Colby (b.1656) and (from December 27, 1675) Sarah Eldridge (b.1658)
 Joseph Colby (b.1680) and (from November 22, 1704) Anne Bartlett (b.1684)
 Nathan Colby (b.1710) and (from December 18, 1735) Hannah Worthen (b.1716)

Based on the data from : The Genealogy of Almanzo and Laura Ingalls Wilder

Peter Riley Ingalls (1833–1900) – born in Cuba, New York. On June 5, 1861, in Brookfield, Wisconsin married Eliza Ann Quiner (see : The Quiners) and they had 6 children (see below). They left Pepin in 1874, together with Laura's family, and stopped in Zumbro Falls, Minnesota. Next they moved to South Troy, Minnesota where the Ingalls visited them for some time (in 1876).
Alice Josephine Ingalls (Apr 23, 1862 – January 30, 1934) – married Arthur Whiting. They had five children, born between 1883 and 1899 (Altha Whiting Taylor, Jay Whiting, Fred Whiting, Vena Whiting Clark and Roy Whiting).
Ella Estella Ingalls (Jan 23, 1865 – March 9, 1945) – married Leslie Lee Whiting and had four sons, born between 1885 and 1894 (Earl Whiting, Floyd Whiting, Harry Whiting and Clarence Whiting). She spent some time in DeSmet, with her husband and the eldest baby Earl Leland.
Peter Franklin Ingalls (Nov 16, 1866 – September 23, 1932) – lived with Laura and Almanzo in De Smet for a while. Married Mary Edith "Molly" McGowin and they had between seven and eight children (presumed to be Edith Ingalls, Alexander Ingalls, Florence Ingalls Lindsey, Pearlie Ingalls Chiles, Fred Ingalls, Mary Ingalls, Mable Ingalls Mims and an unnamed infant)
Lansford Newcomb Ingalls (b. April 5, 1870)
Edith Florence "Dolly Varden" Ingalls (Jun 23, 1872 – July 13, 1951), on June 9, 1892, married Heil Nelson Bingham and they had eight children, born between 1893 and 1912 (Frederick Bingham, Estella Bingham Mahoney, Pearl Bingham Shanahan, Percy Bingham, Mabel Bingham Leverty, Thomas Bingham, Edna Bingham and James Bingham).
Edmond Llewellyn Ingalls (b. August 26, 1880), married Edith Mae Ide and they had 6 children. (Lois Ingalls Gibson, Herbert Ingalls, Wallace Ingalls, Margaret Ingalls Cowsar and William Ingalls).
"baby boy" Ingalls (1835–1835). Died at approximately two weeks of age, of "convulsions", and had not been named yet.
Charles Phillip Ingalls (1836–1902) – Laura's father
 Mary Amelia Ingalls (1865-1928)
 Laura Elizabeth Ingalls (1867-1957)
 Caroline Celestia 'Carrie' Ingalls (1870-1946)
 Charles Frederick 'Freddie' Ingalls (1875-1876)
 Grace Pearl Ingalls (1877-1941)
Lydia Louise Ingalls (1838–1913) – on January 15, 1856, she married Robert Fulton Clough and later – in 1859, Joseph Stouff. She had five children, first of whom was Clough's.
 Issac Lafayette Clough (1858-1893, got married in 1876)
 Amos Alvin Stouff (1860-1893)
 Minnie Stouff (1868-1941)
 Amy Stouff (1870-1947)
 Robert Stouff (1875-1926)
Polly Melona Ingalls (1840–1886) – born in Cuba, New York. In 1859 married Henry Odin Quiner (see : The Quiners) and they had seven children (see below). The family left Pepin with Laura's family in 1868 and both families stopped in Rothville, Missouri. In 1869 they returned to Pepin. Some time later they went West.
 Louisa Martha Quiner (1860-1917), m. Walter Smith and had at least one son, William Smith
 Charles Henry Quiner (1862-1881)
 James Albert Quiner (1865-1947), m. Gertrude Frances Price (1866–1945) in 1903
 Charlotte A. "Lottie" Quiner (1867-), m. Charles Sheldon (1857-1942) and had three daughters (May Sheldon Scharen, Grace Sheldon and Blanche Sheldon)
 George Lansford Quiner (1870-1884)
 Lillian M. "Lillie" Quiner (1873-1881)
 Ruby Quiner (1878-1885) 
Lansford James Ingalls (1842–1928) – was married twice; to Sarah Dickinson (1846–1897) and later to Mary Dickinson. Both of them were born in England.
 Samuel James Ingalls (1866-1933)
 Sara Belle Ingalls (1870-1856)
 William Walter Ingalls (1872-1846)
 Mary Elizabeth Ingalls (1874-1923)
 Andrew Jackson Ingalls (1876-1959)
 Charles Reuben Ingalls (1878-1880)
 Edward Eugene Ingalls (1881-1888)
 Horace Foster Ingalls (1883-1888)
 Olive May Ingalls (1885-1888)
 Martha Esther Ingalls (1887-1977)
Laura Ladocia "Docia" Ingalls (July 8, 1845 – January 18, 1918) – married August Waldvogel (divorced later) and the couple had two children (see below). Next she married Hiram "Hi" Forbes and they had seven daughters. Hiram was a contractor for the Chicago and North Western Railway. They spent some time in DeSmet with the Ingalls but soon moved to Nebraska. They lost contact. Hiram died in 1906, and Docia subsequently moved to Colorado. She died twelve years later. 
 Lena Evelyn Waldvogel (1866–1943), m. Samuel Aughey Heikes and they had eight children (Agnes Heikes Kate, Eugene Heikes, Marion Heikes Lueder, Samuel Heikes, Lola Heikes Flack, Winfred Heikes, Warren Heikes and Geraldine Heikes Sloan) 
 August Eugene "Jean" Waldvogel (1870-1945), m. first Maria Luella Harmon and subsequently Leona Beatrice Hinton, and had seven children in total (Earl Waldvogel, William Waldvogel, Velma Waldvogel Mellor, Verne Waldvogel, Ernest Waldvogel, Robert Waldvogel and Leonard Waldvogel). Died in a car accident along with Leona, Verne and Leonard. 
 Ida May Forbes (1875-1953), m. Charles W. Norman
 Adeline Forbes (1877-1936), m. Algernon "Al" Russell
 Emma Laura Forbes (1879-1912), m. Henry Schneider
 Mary Amanda Forbes (1881-1958), m. Edward Oscar Baker
 Maud Marie Forbes (1884-1983), m. Joseph Gregg or John Gunderson
 Frances I. Forbes (1887-1968), m. Joseph Halda
 Katie P. Forbes (1890-1919) - possibly married a man with the surname Wilton
Hiram Lemuel Ingalls (1848–1923) – on October 18, 1867, married Sarah Elizabeth Woodward (1847–1910) and on February 27, 1919 – Ellen Parker
 Laura Eliza Ingalls (1867–1943), m. John Monroe Butterfield (1856–1943)
 Ruby Evaline Ingalls (1871–1941), m. Austin Johnson Beers (1852–1929) in 1884 and William E. Garrison (1874–1947) in 1931
 Phillip L. Ingalls 
 Sarah Jeanette Ingalls (1877–1956), m. Emil Otto Kreiner (1865–1937) and later Bernard Connor (1871–1914) in 1896
 Mary Rose Ellen Ingalls (1880–1951), m. Marion Ormal Kezer (1875–1942)
 Hiram LeRoy "Roy" Ingalls (1882–1949), m. Mathilda Bartosh (1883–1966) in 1901
 Leo Vincent Kreiner Ingalls (1896–1974), m. Viola Edna Edgerton. Adopted by Hiram in 1898.
George Whiting Ingalls (1851–1901) - married Julia E. Bard (1858–1910) in Alden, Wisconsin, and moved with her to Webster, Wisconsin
"baby boy" Ingalls (b. 1878) - died shortly after birth	
"baby boy" Ingalls (b. 1880) - died shortly after birth
 Benjamin Ingalls (1884-1885) - suffocated on the way back from a family visit
Ruby Celestia Ingalls (1855–1881) - married Joseph Card (1849-1923)
 George Card (?)
 Sherman Card (?)
 Alma Josephine "Dolly Varden" Card (1880-1885)
NOTE: A second daughter of Ruby Ingalls Card, Lettie Letishia Card Anderson, is listed as being born in 1888, seven years after Ruby's death. How this is possible is unknown.

The Quiner family

(Laura's maternal great-great-grandparents)
Allan Alexander Morse and Margaret Drummond *These are fictional names. Real names unknown.

(Laura's maternal great-grandparents)
Lewis Tucker (1779–1870) and Martha Gráinne Morse (1772–1862)
William Quiner (1773–1831) and Margaret Doer (1774–1839)

(Laura's maternal grandparents)
Charlotte Tucker and Henry Quiner
THEIR CHILDREN (Laura's aunts and uncles) :
Martha Morse Quiner (1832–1836)
Joseph Carpenter Quiner (1834–1862). He married Nancy Frank in Wisconsin in 1856. Died of wounds suffered at the Battle of Shiloh.
 Frank R Quiner (1859–1944)
 John Carpenter Quiner (1861–1950)
Henry Odin Quiner (1835–1880) – born on December 7 in Ohio. He married Polly Ingalls (for more – see above)
Martha Jane Quiner (1837–1927) – married Charles Carpenter in 1860 and had fourteen children.
William Augustus Carpenter (1861–1884)
Joseph Quiner Carpenter (1863–1923) married Elizabeth C.Reese.
Phoebe Carpenter
Joseph Carpenter
Elizabeth Carpenter
Clara Carpenter
Martha Carpenter
Charles Carpenter
Theodore Carpenter
Donald Carpenter
Lillian Carpenter
Emilie Carpenter
Lettice "Lottie" Jane Carpenter (1864–1949)
Nancy Cora Carpenter (1865–1955)
Martha Eliza Carpenter (1868–1871)
Millicent Ann Carpenter (1869–1960)
Charles Carr Carpenter (1871–1918)
Emma Bertha Carpenter (1873–1955)
Etta Minerva Carpenter (1874–1899)
Martha Josephine Carpenter (1876–1962)
Marion Caroline Carpenter (1879–1939)
Myrtie Emmeline Carpenter (1879–1956)
Thomas Quiner Carpenter (1882–1944)
George Lockwood Carpenter (1882–1954)
Caroline Lake Quiner (December 12, 1839 – April 20, 1924) – Laura's mother
Eliza Ann Quiner (1842–1931) – born on April 21 in Brookfield, Wisconsin. Both families – the Ingalls and the Quiners – moved several times and stopped finally in Jefferson County, Wisconsin. Eliza married Peter Ingalls in Concord, Wisconsin, on June 5, 1861 (for more – see above).
Thomas Lewis Quiner (1844–1903) – born on November 23. He married Lillian Graham 'Lily' Hill (1858-1924) and they had six children. They lived for some time in DeSmet. Died in an accident at the Columbia River on February 23, 1903.
Helen Marion Quiner (1881-1961)
Alice Quiner (1882-1883)
Donald Quiner (1885-1887)
Lillian Josephine Quiner (1887-1959)
Dugald Lewis Quiner (1889-1964)
John Hill Quiner (1900-1978)
Henry Quiner died in October 1844 in the sinking of a trading ship on the Great Lakes. Charlotte Tucker Quiner remarried, to Frederic Holbrook, and they had one child
Charlotte Elizabeth "Lottie" Holbrook (January 20, 1854 – February 15, 1939). She married Henry Moore (b. 1852) in 1875 and they had five children.
Frederick Moore (b. 1878)
Arvin Moore (b. 1880)
Harry C. Moore (b. 1882)
Ralph Moore (b. 1887)
Pearl Eva Moore (b. 1888)

Charlotte Tucker

Charlotte Wallis Tucker was born on May 25, 1809, in Roxbury, Massachusetts (a suburb of Boston). She died September 20, 1884, in Rome, Wisconsin. Her mostly fictionalised story was described in the four-book series The Charlotte Years by Melissa Wiley. Charlotte was maternal grandmother to Laura Ingalls Wilder.

As a young woman, Charlotte married Henry Newton Quiner from Connecticut. She was the first woman in her family to travel west, living in Ohio and Indiana before settling in the frontier town of Brookfield, Wisconsin.

Martha Morse

Martha Morse was born on January 2, 1782, in Scotland, where her father was a wealthy landowners in the Scottish Highlands. Her mostly fictionalised story was told in the four-book series The Martha Years, by Melissa Wiley. Martha was Charlotte Tucker's mother and great-grandmother to Laura Ingalls Wilder.

Martha married Lewis Tucker, a blacksmith's son. Lewis and Martha travelled to the United States and began their new life near Boston, Massachusetts, becoming the first of Laura's ancestors to immigrate to America.

The Wilder family

 Royal Gould Wilder (1809–1815)
 Thomas Payne Wilder (1811–?)
 James Mason Wilder (1813-1899) – Almanzo's father. Married Angeline Albina Day.
Laura Ann Wilder (1844–1899) – born June 15, 1844, in 1874 married Harrison Lomanzo Howard.
Kearny Howard (step-child, born c.1869)
Angelina Esther Howard (1876–1964), in 1897 married Fred Merritt.
Ralph Merritt
Ethel Merritt
Howard Merritt
Harrison J.Howard (1878–1918)
Josephine Howard (1880–1918), married to William Walker
Ralph Waldo Howard (1881–1934), married to Estelle C.
Charles E. Howard (1908–1978)
Clarence Howard (1909–1913)
James J. Howard (1911–1981)
Ralph R. Howard (1913–1921)
Ralph Waldo Howard (1914–1976)
Paul Martin Howard (1920–1923)
Royal Gould Wilder (1847–1925), born February 20, 1847. In 1893, married Electa Averill Hutchison.
Ethel Hutchinson (step-child, died 1905), married Willard Stevens (died in 1928)
Clyde Hutchinson (step-child), married Edna Baily
Rae Hutchinson (step-child), married Bertha Luedtke (died 1910)
Mae Hutchinson (step-child), in 1912 married George Pooler
Angeline Bernice Wilder (1894–1957), in 1917 married Arlow Laging and in 1929, George Granger.
"baby girl" Wilder (stillborn in 1897)
Susan E. Wilder (1898–1899)
Eliza Jane Wilder (1850–1930), born January 3, 1850. In 1893, married Thomas Jefferson Thayer and in 1904, Maxwell Gordon. Died in Los Angeles.
Walcott Wilder Thayer (1894–1965), in 1918 married Frances Cockrell.
Walter Thayer – married Elaine Ditch
Cynthia Thayer
Walter Thayer
Francis Gervaise Thayer – married Alena Jobe.
Thomas Thayer
Larry Thayer
Betty Mae Thayer – married a man with the surname Raymond, and later, married a man with the surname Huey.
Cynthia Raymond
Walter Raymond
David Huey
Joan Huey
Donald Huey
Alice Maria Wilder (1853–1892), born September 3, 1853. In 1879 married Albert A.Baldwin (1848–1905). Died in Florida.
 Myrtle Baldwin (1880–1945), married to John R. Brown
Leland Edward Baldwin (1884–1913)
Almanzo Wilder (1857–1949)
Perley Day Wilder (1869–1934), born June 13, 1869, In 1897 married Elsie Lillian Merritt (1879–1948). Died in Los Angeles.
James Wilder (1903–1990), married Thelma Gricourt
Gladys Wilder (1905–1987)
Harold O. Wilder (1909–2003)
Perley Wilder Jr., (1912–1977), married to Ethel Smith, and later, Dolores Moore
Dorothy A. Wilder (1914–1966). Married to Carl Pittman
John Wilder (1916–1916)
 Hannah Payne Wilder (1814–1891)
 Royal Gould Wilder (1816–1887) – born after his eldest brother's death (and so named after him). He became a reverend and married Eliza Jane Smith (1822-1910).
Edward Payson Wilder (1847-1890)
Mary Jane Wilder (b.1856)
William Royal Wilder (1858-1925)
Grace Evelyn Wilder (1861-1911)
Robert Parmelee Wilder (1863-1938)
 Phoebe Wilder (1821–1890) – married Joseph C. Lamson.
Chester Lamson (1854–1934) – married Catherine McDonough.
Mabel Lamson (1888–1982)
Charles Lamson
Gussie Lamson
"baby girl" Lamson
 Polly Maria Wilder (1824–1851)
 William Wilder (1828–1909) - married Adeline Hastins (1831-1909)
William A. "Willie" Wilder (1847-1860)
George Wilder (1868-1922)
 Sarah Charlotte Wilder (1820–1892) – married Andrew Day (her sister-in-law's – Almanzo's mother – brother)
Carrie May Day (1856–1898) – married Orville Everett.
Frances Everett – married a man with the last name of Smith.
Dorothy Belle Smith
Elmer A.Day (1862–1947) – married to Mary MacMaster (1864–1945)
Willard R.Day (1858–1891) – married Emma Hubbard
Grace Day (1864–1894) – married to Grant Collins
 Joshua Prince Wilder (1832–1832)

The Day family

 Laura Day (1819–?)
 Delia Day (1824–?)
 Angelina Albina Day (1819-1905) – married James Mason Wilder and they had six children, including Almanzo James Wilder (Laura Ingalls Wilder's husband). For more information, see above.
 Celinda A.Day (1826–?)
 Andrew J. Day (1828–1894) – married Sarah Charlotte Wilder (1820–1892) and they had four children. For more information, see the Wilders' tree above (since Sarah was a sister of Almanzo's father).
 John Wesley Day (1829–1907) – married Alcesta Lindy.
Fred Day
Frank Day
Albert Day
Wilton Day
George W.Day (1831–1873)

Neighbors, friends and acquaintances

Real people
Robert and Ellie Boast, were neighbors and friends of the Ingalls family.
Reverend Edward Brown, was the reverend and Ingalls's neighbour in De Smet, South Dakota
Ida Wright-Brown, was an adopted daughter of the Reverend and Laura's school friend in De Smet
Oscar Edmund "Cap" Garland was one of the male school friends of Laura. He saved the town from starvation by going 15 miles to find wheat in a blizzard, along with Almanzo Wilder.
Florence Adelia Garland Dawley was a teacher in De Smet and an older sister of Cap Garland.
Mary Power, was Laura's friend in De Smet
Neta Seal, was a real-life close friend of grown-up Laura in Mansfield, Missouri
Dr. Tann, was the Indians' doctor in Kansas, during Ingalls's stay there

Characters based on real people
Lew Brewster was a pseudonym for Louis Bouchie, a homesteader who offered Laura her first teaching job.
Mr. Edwards, Ingalls's fictional friend
The Kennedy Family were the Ingalls's neighbors in Walnut Grove, Minnesota and their children went to school with Mary and Laura
Nellie Oleson was actually three real people: Nellie Owens, Genevieve Masters, and Stella Gilbert.
Soldat du Chene, was a fictional Osage chief in Kansas, during Ingalls's stay there

References

External links
Laura's family at Frontier Girl
Official Little House books homepage
Laura's and Almanzo's relatives
Genealogy - Laura Ingalls Wilder

Little House on the Prairie (TV series)
Little House on the Prairie
Little House on the Prairie
Little House on the Prairie characters

pl:Domek na prerii (serial telewizyjny)#Obsada
it:La casa nella prateria#Personaggi e interpreti